In geometry, the icosidodecadodecahedron (or icosified dodecadodecahedron) is a nonconvex uniform polyhedron, indexed as U44. It has 44 faces (12 pentagons, 12 pentagrams and 20 hexagons), 120 edges and 60 vertices.  Its vertex figure is a crossed quadrilateral.

Related polyhedra 
It shares its vertex arrangement with the uniform compounds of 10 or 20 triangular prisms. It additionally shares its edges with the rhombidodecadodecahedron (having the pentagonal and pentagrammic faces in common) and the rhombicosahedron (having the hexagonal faces in common).

See also 
 List of uniform polyhedra
 Snub icosidodecadodecahedron

References

External links 
 

Uniform polyhedra